John Joseph Brady (born 1942) lives in Newburyport, Massachusetts. He is a visiting professor who teaches news writing and editing, as well as graphics, at the E.W. Scripps School of Journalism at Ohio University in Athens, Ohio.

Career
Brady served as editor-in-chief of Writer's Digest and Boston magazine. He was founding editor of The Artist's Magazine and M:The Magazine for Montessori Families. He has been teaching at universities and in various fora since the early 1990s, including a stint in 1996 as Hearst Visiting professor at the Missouri School of Journalism.

Publications
 
Brady is the author of Bad Boy: The Life and Politics of Lee Atwater. He also wrote The Craft of the Screenwriter (Simon & Schuster, 1981), as well as two books for journalists – The Craft of Interviewing (Random House Vintage, 1976) and The Interviewer's Handbook (The Writer Books, 2004).  He publishes a monthly column on magazine editing for Folio magazine. His book Frank & Ava: In Love and War (October, 2015) retells the story of the romance between Frank Sinatra and Ava Gardner.

Works
The Craft of Interviewing (1976) 
The Craft of the Screenwriter (1981) 
 Bad Boy: The Life and Politics of Lee Atwater (1996) 
The Interviewer's Handbook (2004) 
Frank & Ava: In Love and War (2015)

References

External links
 Biography at Scripps School of Journalism

Living people
American biographers
American male biographers
American instructional writers
Place of birth missing (living people)
Ohio University faculty
Writers from Newburyport, Massachusetts
1942 births